"Goin' Down to Rio" is a song by Jeff Lynne, B-side to "Doin' That Crazy Thing".

Track listing
The songs are written by Jeff Lynne.

"Doin' That Crazy Thing" - 3:25
"Goin' Down to Rio" - 3:45

References

Song recordings produced by Jeff Lynne
Jeff Lynne songs
Songs written by Jeff Lynne
1977 songs

pt:Goin' Down To Rio (canção de Jeff Lynne)